A constitutional referendum was held in Spain on Wednesday, 6 December 1978, to gauge support for either the ratification or repealing of the Spanish Constitution which had been approved by the Cortes Generales on 31 October 1978. The question asked was "Do you approve of the Constitution Bill?". The referendum resulted in 91.8% of valid votes in support of the bill on a turnout of 67.1%.

Purpose
The new constitution was intended to replace the many constitutional laws of the Franco era, the Fundamental Laws of the Realm, and turn Spain into a constitutional monarchy by removing many of the King's powers. The feat of creating a democratic system without breaking the structures of power of the state was made possible by the approval of the Political Reform Act of 1977, passed by the Francoist Cortes as the last Fundamental Law. It had been drafted by the President of the Cortes Españolas, Torcuato Fernández-Miranda (including changes that would replace the Cortes Españolas with a Cortes Generales), and supported by Prime Minister Adolfo Suárez and King Juan Carlos. The law provided for the legalization of political parties and a democratic election to Constituent Cortes, a committee of which then drafted the Constitution.

Results

Overall

Results by region

Issues
Some Spanish media found up to 30% of irregularities in the census in certain provinces, with many people allegedly being unable to vote while others voted twice. Adolfo Suárez's government had lowered voting age from 21 to 18 only three weeks before the referendum, which resulted in a made-up electoral register increasing by over 3 million people compared to the 1977 general election amid technical, administrative and logistical issues. Interior Ministry officials acknowledged deviations of up to 5.1 per 100 in the electoral census—roughly 1.5 million people according to the National Institute of Statistics—resulting from the absence of an official electoral register and in an overreliance on data from municipal registers.

References

Referendums in Spain
1978 referendums
1978 in Spain
Constitutional referendums